Belgrade has been besieged numerous times in its history, Siege of Belgrade may refer to:

 Siege of Belgrade (1440), failed Ottoman siege
 Siege of Belgrade (1456), failed Ottoman siege
 Siege of Belgrade (1521), Belgrade captured by the Ottomans
 Siege of Belgrade (1688), Belgrade captured by the Habsburgs
 Siege of Belgrade (1690), Belgrade captured by the Ottomans
 Siege of Belgrade (1693), failed Habsburg siege
 Siege of Belgrade (1717), Belgrade captured by the Habsburgs
 Siege of Belgrade (1739), Belgrade captured by the Ottomans
 Siege of Belgrade (1789), Belgrade captured by the Habsburgs, but returned in the Treaty of Sistova (1791)
 The poem The Siege of Belgrade, about the 1789 siege, by Alaric Alexander Watts
 The opera The Siege of Belgrade (1791) by Stephen Storace
 Siege of Belgrade (1806), Belgrade captured by the Serbs
 Belgrade Offensive (1944), Belgrade captured by the Red Army and Yugoslav Partisans

Military history of Belgrade